Çəpli is a village in the Kalbajar District of Azerbaijan.

References 
 

Populated places in Kalbajar District